Besen or Bešen is a surname. Notable people with the surname include:

Gabrijela Bešen-Bartulović (born 1994), Croatian handball goalkeeper, sister of Lucija
Lucija Bešen (born 1994), Croatian handball goalkeeper, sister of Gabrijela
Ümit Besen (born 1956), represents the darker side of Tarabya school of electronic music
Wayne Besen (born 1970), American gay rights advocate
Sunny Besen Thrasher (born 1976), former Canadian child actor

See also
Bese (disambiguation)
Bessens

de:Besen